John Bergen may refer to:

John G. Bergen (1814–1867), American public servant and New York City Police Commissioner
John J. Bergen (1896–1980), American businessman and chairman of the Madison Square Garden Corporation
John T. Bergen (1786–1855), U.S. Representative from New York

See also
John von Bergen, Berlin-based American artist
John S. Van Bergen (1885–1969), American architect